Uroš Drezgić (born 4 October 2002) is a Serbian footballer who plays as a defender for Čukarički.

Career statistics

Club

Notes

References

2002 births
Living people
Serbian footballers
Serbia youth international footballers
Association football defenders
Serbian SuperLiga players
OFK Beograd players
FK Čukarički players
Serbia under-21 international footballers